Tímea Babos and Anastasia Pavlyuchenkova were the defending champions, but chose not to participate this year.

Gabriela Dabrowski and Xu Yifan won the title, defeating Latisha Chan and Andrea Sestini Hlaváčková in the final, 6–3, 6–1.

Seeds

Draw

Draw

References
Draw

Sydney International - Doubles
Women's Doubles